General elections were held in Luxembourg on 7 June 2009, together with the 2009 election to the European Parliament.  All sixty members of the Chamber of Deputies were elected for five years.  The polls were topped by the Christian Social People's Party, which built upon its already high number of seats to achieve a commanding victory, with the highest vote share and number of seats of any party since 1954. Incumbent Prime Minister Jean-Claude Juncker, who is longest serving head of government in the European Union, renewed the coalition agreement with Deputy Prime Minister and Luxembourg Socialist Workers' Party leader Jean Asselborn and formed the Juncker-Asselborn Ministry II, which was sworn-in on 23 July 2009.

Parties
Seven parties ran candidates in all four circonscriptions, of which, five were already represented in the Chamber of Deputies: the Christian Social People's Party (CSV), the Luxembourg Socialist Workers' Party (LSAP), the Democratic Party (DP), the Greens, and the Alternative Democratic Reform Party (ADR).  Two parties that were not then represented also ran: The Left and the Communist Party (KPL).  In addition, the Citizens' List, which was headed by current independent deputy Aly Jaerling, ran in two constituencies.

Results

By locality

As in 2004, the CSV won pluralities in each of Luxembourg's four circonscriptions, and pluralities in nearly all of Luxembourg's communes.  Only four communes didn't register pluralities for the CSV (down from seven in 2004).  Wiltz in the north and Dudelange, Kayl, and Rumelange in the southern Red Lands voted for the LSAP.

The CSV's performance improved most markedly in Centre, where it increased its vote from 35.5% to 38.6%.  In Centre, the CSV received almost twice as many votes as the Democratic Party in, only ten years after the DP won a plurality by over 2%.  It gained one extra seat in Centre, and another in Est.

Aftermath
The CSV's large margin of victory guaranteed that it would form the government once again, with Jean-Claude Juncker appointed as formateur and likely to remain as Prime Minister.  Before the election, Juncker, Europe's longest-serving head of government, had told his party that he intended to step down as Minister for Finances, to be replaced by Luc Frieden.  This brought into question his chairmanship of the Europe-wide Eurogroup, which he had chaired since 2005.  However, he has since stated that he would remain in charge of monetary policy and relations with the European Central Bank.

The CSV was in a strong enough position to form a coalition with any one of three parties: LSAP (partner in the Juncker-Asselborn Ministry I), the DP (partner in the Juncker-Polfer Ministry), and the Greens (who had never previously entered the government).  However, the DP and Greens had both ruled out the possibility of a coalition with the CSV, leaving only the previous coalition partners, LSAP, in the running.  The CSV and LSAP formed a coalition agreement, with Juncker as Prime Minister and Jean Asselborn as Deputy Prime Minister, with the new government forming on 23 July.

References

Luxembourg
2009 in Luxembourg
Chamber of Deputies (Luxembourg) elections
June 2009 events in Europe